Freemason was an Australian racehorse from the early 2000s. He was owned by the Inghams and trained by John Hawkes. His most famous win was the 2003 BMW Stakes where he raced neck and neck down the straight with Northerly and just prevailed. He won A$3,482,440.

References
 Freemason's racing record
 Freemason's pedigree and racing stats

See also
List of millionaire racehorses in Australia

1996 racehorse births
Thoroughbred family 9-e
Racehorses bred in Australia
Racehorses trained in Australia